The Delta Factor is a 1970 American adventure film, co-produced and directed by Tay Garnett who co-wrote the screenplay with Raoul Walsh. It stars Christopher George and Yvette Mimieux. The film is based on the 1967 novel by Mickey Spillane.

Plot
A glamorous CIA agent, Kim Stacy, gets a new assignment. She is to work with a man named Morgan, a convict serving time for the theft of $40 million that was never recovered.

Morgan is given a chance to earn a reduced sentence by aiding in the rescue of a scientist who has been taken prisoner on a Caribbean isle. Morgan infiltrates the fortress by posing as a drug dealer. He discovers hundreds of political prisoners being held there. He also encounters Dekker, an old war comrade who stole the $40 million and framed Morgan for the crime.

Dekker is about to flee the island with Kim held at gunpoint. Morgan shoots him and boards the plane, which he and Kim fly to safety. But with her consent, grateful for Morgan's having saved her life, Kim permits him to bail out by parachute so that he can go find the $40 million.

Cast
Christopher George as Morgan
Yvette Mimieux as Kim Stacy
Diane McBain as Lisa
Ralph Taeger as Keefer
Yvonne De Carlo as Valerie

References

External links

1970 films
Films directed by Tay Garnett
Films based on American novels
Films based on works by Mickey Spillane
1970s English-language films
1970s adventure films
American adventure films
1970s American films